The Council for the Order of Australia is  the body responsible for deciding on new appointments within the Order of Australia. It was established by Letters Patent issued by Queen Elizabeth II on 14 February 1975 and as amended subsequently. The Prime Minister of Australia of the day appoints the Council chair, deputy chair and seven “community representatives”, while each state and territory appoints a representative. In addition, the Official Secretary to the Governor-General of Australia is the ex officio Secretary of the Council, and there are three other ex officio members.

Board members

References

External links
Council for the Order of Australia - Australian Government

Order of Australia
Order of Australia
1975 establishments in Australia